Tarbet (in full  'Crossing Place of Loch Lomond') is a small village in Argyll and Bute, Scotland.  Located within the Loch Lomond and The Trossachs National Park.

Traditionally on the northern fringes of the historic County of Dunbartonshire, it is on the banks of Loch Lomond, and has a pier.  It stands on an isthmus where Loch Long and Loch Lomond come close.  The village of Arrochar stands at the head of Loch Long, at the other side of the isthmus.  Arrochar and Tarbet railway station, on the West Highland Line, stands between the two villages. The village has a primary school (Arrochar Primary School), hotels and bed and breakfasts, and a Tourist Information Centre.

Its name comes from the Scottish Gaelic word for isthmus, although Tarbert is the more common anglicization, and Tarbat also exists.

The village is formed around the junction of the A82 (Glasgow/Inverness) and A83 (Tarbert/Campbeltown).

The area around Arrochar and Tarbet has become the scene of "squirrel wars".  The red squirrel is resisting the offensive by the grey squirrel taking place across United Kingdom, since there is a type of woodland they find more favourable than most.

Notable residents
Prof William John McCallien FRSE geologist and landscape artist

Gallery

References

External links

 Video footage of Arrochar & Tarbet railway station
 Loch Lomond and The Trossachs National Park
 Arrochar, Tarbet and Ardlui history website
 Arrochar and Tarbet website - shows places to stay, things to do, local shops, restaurants and companies

Villages in Argyll and Bute
Loch Lomond